Lake Kahala is a lake of Estonia.

See also
List of lakes of Estonia

Kahala
Kuusalu Parish
Kahala